The BL 4-inch gun Mk I – Mk VI were a family of early British breech-loading 4-inch naval guns.

History

13 cwt Mk I, 15 calibres 
This was the first 4-inch BL gun. With its short (60-inch total) barrel it had a range of only 5,500 yards.

22.5 cwt Mk I, 25 calibres 
With its longer barrel (100 inch bore) Mk I had a range of 7,200 yards.
Both early Mk I types were quickly withdrawn from service following the explosion of a similar BL 6 inch Mk II gun on board HMS Cordelia in June 1891. Mk I 22.5 cwt continued to be used for training.

26 cwt Mks II - VI, 27 calibres 
The improved 27-calibre Mk II gun and subsequent Marks, often referred to as 4 inch 26 cwt, replaced the early Mk I versions in service. The longer barrel (108 inch bore : 27 calibres) gave it a range of 7,700 yards.

Mk II guns and later Marks armed the following warships :
  as re-gunned in 1885
  as re-gunned in 1885
 Pygmy-class composite screw gunboats of 1888
 s launched in 1889
  as re-gunned in 1891
 s of 1894

The gun was succeeded in its class from 1895 by the QF 4-inch gun Mk I.

QFC 4-inch gun 
A small number of these guns were converted to QF to use the same cartridges as the QF 4-inch gun. They were designated Mk I/IV, I/VI etc. depending on which Mark of BL 4-inch had been converted. All had a bore of 27.85 calibres after conversion, with a muzzle velocity of 2,177 ft/second.

Surviving examples 
 A gun from 1888 at Explosion! The Museum of Naval Firepower, Gosport from Victorian Forts and Artillery website
 A gun from HMS Gannet, mounted on top of Calshot Castle at the entrance to Southampton Water from Victorian Forts and Artillery website

See also 
 List of naval guns

Notes and references

Bibliography 
 Text Book of Gunnery, 1887. LONDON : PRINTED FOR HIS MAJESTY'S STATIONERY OFFICE, BY HARRISON AND SONS, ST. MARTIN'S LANE 
 Text Book of Gunnery, 1902. LONDON : PRINTED FOR HIS MAJESTY'S STATIONERY OFFICE, BY HARRISON AND SONS, ST. MARTIN'S LANE 
 Tony DiGiulian, British Early 4" (10.2 cm) Breech Loaders

External links 
 Handbook for 4-inch B.L. gun mark V and VI land service 1890 at State Library of Victoria
 Handbook of the 4-inch Gun Marks V and VI. (Land Service.) 1904

 Mk V or VI gun as movable fortification gun, on siege overbank carriage. At Victorian Forts and Artillery website
 Mk I diagram and photos at Victorian Forts and Artillery website

 

Naval guns of the United Kingdom
100 mm artillery
Victorian-era weapons of the United Kingdom